The 2014 Islington Council election took place on 22 May 2014 to elect members of Islington Council in England. This was on the same day as other local elections.

The final result was 47 seats for the Labour Party and 1 seat for the Green Party of England and Wales. The Labour Party received 56 per cent of the vote, its highest total in Islington since 1974. The Liberal Democrats lost all its seats despite having controlled the Council as a minority administration from 2006–2010.

Election result

Ward results

References

Islington
2014